Benjamin "Ben" Jackson is a fictional character played by Michael Craze in the long-running British science fiction television series Doctor Who. A seaman in the Royal Navy from 1966, he was a companion to the First and Second Doctors and a regular in the programme from 1966 to 1967. Ben appeared in 9 stories (36 episodes). The War Machines, the character's first appearance, is the only one of his stories to exist fully in the British Broadcasting Corporation (BBC) archives.

Character history
Ben first appears in the First Doctor serial The War Machines, when he meets Polly and Dodo in a London nightclub called the Inferno. An Able Seaman in the Royal Navy, serving aboard , Ben is feeling depressed and angry because he has been posted to barracks for six months' shore leave while his ship is deployed to the West Indies. Polly and Dodo try to cheer him up. When another patron accosts Polly in the club, Ben comes to her rescue. Eventually, Ben and Polly aid the Doctor in his battle against the rogue artificial intelligence known as WOTAN. Afterwards, when Ben and Polly bear the Doctor news of Dodo's decision to stay in 1966 and try to return Dodo's key to the time machine, they  accidentally get carried away in the TARDIS. It is implied that these events occur on the last day of Ben's shore posting: in The Smugglers, he pleads, "make sure that I get back by teatime, Doctor. I've got to get back to my ship by tonight."

Ben is a salt-of-the-Earth kind of fellow, dependable and faithful, but prone to become suspicious when kept in the dark or not understanding what is going on. In The Power of the Daleks Ben reveals that, as a child, he lived opposite a brewery. He is very attached to Polly—whom he considers posh, nicknaming her "Duchess"—and appoints himself protector of both her and the Doctor. He is present with Polly when the Doctor regenerates for the first time, and continues to travel with the Second Doctor. During his travels with Polly and the new Doctor, he encounters Daleks, Cybermen and Macra, and meets the Doctor's next companion, Jamie McCrimmon.

Eventually, the TARDIS finds its way back to 1966 London (in The Faceless Ones) on 20 July—the very day Ben and Polly had left (although about a year had passed for them). They decide to remain behind to resume their lives without disruption, leaving the Doctor and Jamie to travel on.

What happens to Ben after his return to Earth is unclear. The Doctor seems to think that Ben will become an Admiral and that Polly will look after Ben, but it is not clear if this is a prediction or simply wishing them well. In the audio story The Five Companions, an older Polly tells the Fifth Doctor that she and Ben are still together.

in Death of the Doctor, Sarah Jane Smith mentions that Ben is working with Polly in India and "running an orphanage there."

Ben and Polly appear in the 2017 Doctor Who Christmas special "Twice Upon a Time", portrayed by Jared Garfield and Lily Travers respectively. The episode's plot involves the events of The Tenth Planet.

Other appearances
In the spin off short story "Mondas Passing" by Paul Grice (in the anthology Short Trips) which takes place in 1986, it is revealed that Ben and Polly have gone their separate ways and married other people. Ben meets a divorced Polly again with the help of the Second Doctor in 1999 ("That Time I Nearly Destroyed The World Whilst Looking For a Dress" by Joseph Lidster, published in Short Trips: Past Tense), where the two admit their love for each other.

Big Finish audios have recently 're-cast' Elliot Chapman as Ben Jackson in various audio releases. One of these- The Forsaken- the TARDIS lands on an island off the coast of Japan during the Second World War, where they actually meet Ben's father shortly before Ben's conception, ensuring that the time travellers stay on the island so that they can make sure Ben's father gets home.

List of appearances

Television
Season 3
The War Machines
Season 4
The Smugglers
The Tenth Planet
The Power of the Daleks (Episodes 1-4, 6)
The Highlanders
The Underwater Menace
The Moonbase
The Macra Terror
The Faceless Ones
Series 10
"Twice Upon a Time"

Novels
Virgin Missing Adventures
Invasion of the Cat-People by Gary Russell

Past Doctor Adventures
The Murder Game by Steve Lyons
The Roundheads by Mark Gatiss
Dying in the Sun by Jon de Burgh Miller
Ten Little Aliens by Stephen Cole

Telos Doctor Who novellas
Wonderland by Mark Chadbourn

Short stories
"Mondas Passing" by Paul Grice (Short Trips)
"That Time I Nearly Destroyed The World Whilst Looking For a Dress" by Joseph Lidster (Short Trips: Past Tense)
"Pluto" by Dale Smith (Short Trips: The Solar System)
"Do You Dream in Colour" by Gary Russell (Short Trips: The Ghosts of Christmas)
"The Slave War" by Una McCormack (Short Trips: The Quality of Leadership)

Comics
"The Tests of Trefus" by David Brian (Doctor Who Annual 1968)
"World Without Night" by David Brian (Doctor Who Annual 1968)
"Food for Thought" by Nicholas Briggs and Colin Andrew (Doctor Who Magazine 218–220)

Audio stories
Resistance (adventure related by Polly)
The Three Companions (adventure related by Polly)
The Forbidden Time (an adventure related by the characters Polly & Jamie)
The Selachian Gambit (an adventure related by the characters Polly & Jamie)
 The House of Cards (an adventure related by the characters Polly & Jamie)

In 2015, Elliot Chapman joined Big Finish in the role of Ben. He performed the role in a number of Companion Chronicles and Early Adventures until the end of 2019.

References

External links

 Ben Jackson on the BBC's Doctor Who website

Doctor Who companions
Fictional people from London
Fictional sailors
Male characters in television
Television characters introduced in 1966
Fictional Royal Navy personnel

simple:Doctor Who companions#Ben Jackson